Nuclear engineering is the branch of engineering concerned with the application of breaking down  atomic nuclei (fission) or of combining atomic nuclei (fusion),  or with the application of other sub-atomic processes based on the principles of nuclear physics. In the sub-field of nuclear fission, it particularly includes the design, interaction, and maintenance of systems and components like reactors, power plants, or weaponry.  The field also includes the study of medical and other applications of radiation, particularly Ionizing radiation, nuclear safety, heat/thermodynamics transport, nuclear fuel, or other related technology (e.g., radioactive waste disposal) and the problems of nuclear proliferation. This field also includes chemical engineering and electrical engineering.

Professional areas
The United States currently generates about 20% of its electricity from nuclear power plants. Nuclear engineers in this field generally work, directly or indirectly, in the nuclear power industry or for national laboratories. Current research in the industry is directed at producing economical and proliferation-resistant reactor designs with passive safety features. Some government (national) labs provide research in the same areas as private industry and in other areas such as nuclear fuels and nuclear fuel cycles, advanced reactor designs, and nuclear weapon design and maintenance. A principal pipeline/source of trained personnel (both military and civilian) for US reactor facilities is the US Navy Nuclear Power Program, including its Nuclear Power School in South Carolina. Employment in nuclear engineering is predicted to grow about nine percent in the year 2022 as needed to replace retiring nuclear engineers, provide maintenance and updating of safety systems in power plants, and to advance the applications of nuclear medicine.

Nuclear medicine and medical physics
Medical physics is an important field of nuclear medicine; its sub-fields include nuclear medicine, radiation therapy, health physics, and diagnostic imaging. Highly specialized and intricately operating equipment, including  x-ray machines, MRI and PET scanners and many other devices provide most of modern medicine's diagnostic capability—along with disclosing subtle treatment options.

Nuclear materials
Nuclear materials research focuses on two main subject areas, nuclear fuels and irradiation-induced modification of nuclear materials. Improvement of nuclear fuels is crucial for obtaining increased efficiency from nuclear reactors. Irradiation effects studies have many purposes, including studying structural changes to reactor components and studying nano-modification of metals using ion-beams or particle accelerators.

Radiation protection and measurement

Radiation measurement is fundamental to the science and practice of radiation protection, sometimes known as radiological protection, which is the protection of people and the environment from the harmful effects of uncontrolled radiation.

Nuclear engineers and radiological scientists are interested in developing more advanced ionizing radiation measurement and detection systems, and using these advances to improve imaging technologies; these areas include detector design, fabrication and analysis, measurements of fundamental atomic and nuclear parameters, and radiation imaging systems, among others.

Nuclear engineering organizations
 American Nuclear Society
 International Atomic Energy Agency
 Nuclear Institute (UK)

See also

Atomic engineering
Atomic physics
Black Swan theory
Brittle Power
Chernobyl nuclear disaster
Earthquake engineering
Fukushima nuclear disaster
International Nuclear Event Scale
List of books about nuclear issues
Lists of nuclear disasters and radioactive incidents
List of nuclear reactors
Megaprojects and Risk
Normal Accidents
Northeast Blackout of 2003
Nuclear fuel
Nuclear criticality safety
Nuclear material
Nuclear Measurements Corporation
Nuclear physics
Nuclear power
Nuclear reactor technology
Nuclear renaissance
Project Gnome
Safety engineering
Thermal hydraulics
Three Mile Island: A Nuclear Crisis in Historical Perspective
Waste Isolation Pilot Plant

References

Further reading
 Ash, Milton, "Nuclear reactor kinetics", McGraw-Hill, (1965)
 Gowing, Margaret. Britain and Atomic Energy, 1939–1945 (1964).
 Gowing, Margaret, and Lorna Arnold. Independence and Deterrence: Britain and Atomic Energy, Vol. I: Policy Making, 1945–52; Vol. II: Policy Execution, 1945–52 (London, 1974)
 Johnston, Sean F. "Creating a Canadian Profession: The Nuclear Engineer, 1940–68," Canadian Journal of History, Winter 2009, Vol. 44 Issue 3, pp 435–466
 Johnston, Sean F. "Implanting a discipline: the academic trajectory of nuclear engineering in the USA and UK," Minerva, 47 (2009), pp. 51–73

External links

 Electric Generation from Commercial Nuclear Power
 Hacettepe University Department of Nuclear Engineering
 Nuclear Engineering International magazine
 Nuclear Safety Info Resources
 Nuclear Science and Engineering technical journal
 Science and Technology of Nuclear Installation Open-Access Journal

Engineering disciplines
Nuclear technology